Grizzly Tales for Gruesome Kids (often nicknamed Grizzly Tales) is the generic trademarked title for a series of award-winning children's books by British author Jamie Rix which were later adapted into an animated television series of the same name produced for ITV. Known for its surreal black comedy and horror, the franchise was immensely popular with children and adults, and the cartoon became one of the most-watched programmes on CITV in the 2000s; a reboot of the cartoon series was produced for Nickelodeon UK and NickToons UK in 2011 with 26 episodes (split into 2 series) with the added tagline of Cautionary Tales for Lovers of Squeam!. The first four books in the series were published between 1990 and 2001 by a variety of publishers (such as Hodder Children's Books, Puffin, and Scholastic) and have since gone out of print but are available as audio adaptations through Audible and iTunes. The ITV cartoon was produced by Honeycomb Animation and aired between 2000 and 2006 with 6 series; reruns aired on the Nickelodeon channels along with the 2011 series. The series returned to CITV on September 6, 2014.

Each book in the franchise contained several cautionary tales about children of many ages and the consequences of their antisocial actions. Due to how far-fetched and fantastical the stories could become, it is up to the reader whether they found the series frightening or amusing, but the franchise is usually categorised as children's horror. When the series was adapted for the CITV/Nickelodeon cartoons, the book chapters became ten-minute episodes that were narrated by comic actor Nigel Planer, and created by Honeycomb Animation, with author Rix as co-director.

The franchise received critical acclaim, noted by the themes of horror surrealism and adult paranoia blended with common children's book absurdity. The Daily Telegraph said of the CITV cartoon, "Mix Dahl with Belloc and you can anticipate with glee these animated tales of Jamie Rix. Even William Brown's antics pale..." and The Sunday Times wrote: "They are superior morality stories and Nigel Planer reads them with a delight that borders on the fiendish."

Plot
The Grizzly Tales series features short stories about cautionary tales and imitates an episodic anthology horror (similar to The Twilight Zone or Tales from the Darkside) with each book chapter a different short story. The typical structure would be a brief glance at a main character's typical day in their life, followed by a change in their routine (e.g. a new possession comes their way or a decision made by them/a supporting character) which eventually goes wrong in a hoisted with their own petard way, with the story ending with the main character either being killed, mutilated, involuntarily shapeshifting, or kidnapped by something/someone supernatural. They usually star children whose misbehaviour (laziness, greediness, vanity, lying, etc.) is failed to be reined in by their parents or guardians, who vary from encouraging it, ignoring it, failing to be firm with their punishments, or do nothing because they are used to being submissive (and are sometimes the victims of their child's abuse). There are exceptions, however, as some stories are about adults, or set in the past, or are pastiches.

Book series

Development

The first story Rix ever created was The Spaghetti Man, after using this new cautionary tale as a white lie to his first son. It was about a little boy who refused to behave at the kitchen table and is kidnapped by an invisible force, that takes him to a factory to turn him into lasagne. Rix took note of how the lie had made his four-year-old eat every meal without hesitations, which would inspire a series that could scare children into behaving themselves. The story of the Spaghetti Man would be included in the franchise debut's Grizzly Tales for Gruesome Kids, which was published in 1990 by André Deutsch's eponymous publishing house. Its popularity led to three sequels: Ghostly Tales for Ghastly Kids (1992), Fearsome Tales for Fiendish Kids (1996), and More Grizzly Tales for Gruesome Kids (2001); the latter book was released as the first cartoon aired on CITV. Possibly due to the franchise gaining popularity, the first four books have been re-released numerous times amongst Puffin and Orion. A variety of illustrators designed the front covers, but the success of the CITV cartoon led to the front covers being redesigned by Honeycomb Productions to look like screencaps of the cartoon characters. After an unspecified number of years, the books went out of print.

Six years later, Rix created a new series for the franchise, now named Grizzly Tales: Cautionary Tales for Lovers of Squeam!; eight books were published between 2007 and 2008, the ninth a compilation full of 12 previously published stories from the first and second in the brand. This series borrowed heavily from the CITV cartoon's format by imitating its framing device style of a character telling the stories to the audience, whereas the previous book series was only a collection of short stories. This new character was The Night Night Porter, a creepy owner of a hotel (named The Hot Hell Darkness) that used vague anecdotes and proverbs to show the reader how they would relate to the stories he was about to tell, and would open his check-in book where the stories have been placed. After telling the stories, he would punish the misbehaving kids to spend eternity in one of his hotel rooms.

Recurring features
Locations of stories varied. Some took place in fictionalised versions of English towns (e.g. Colchester) and others did not (Saucy by Sea). Not all took place in the country of the franchise's origin: "It's Only a Game, Sport!" was set in Australia, for example. "The Chipper Chums Go Scrumping" is a pastiche of the works of Enid Blyton and is set in the Kentish countryside in 1952.

Naming conventions highlighted the humour. The Independent on Sunday pointed out, "Jamie Rix’s splendidly nasty short stories can be genuinely scary, but as the protagonists are obnoxious brats with names like Peregrine and Tristram, you may find yourself cheering as they meet their sticky ends." Some of the characters' surnames implied their roles in the story (Mr. and Mrs. Frightfully-Busy were workaholics, Johnny Bullneck is an aggressive school bully, and Serena Slurp is greedy) whereas the more ridiculous the family name is, the more unpleasant they are in the story: Fedora Funkelfink the con artist; and the upper-middle-class Crumpdump family, who trophy hunt to impress their spoilt children. "Knock Down Ginger", meanwhile, is set in a fictional town called Nimby, a notorious home for middle-class snobs. Some of the punishments that the horrible characters have are based on puns: loud-mouthed Dolores from "Silence is Golden" is taken to an alchemist and is turned into a gold statue; "Kiss and Make Up" was a double meaning title about a girl who used make up to look prettier so that she could have her first kiss with a handsome boy in her school. Other titles are pop-culture references ("Fatal Attraction", "The Big Sleep", "The Barber of Civil", "Monty's Python", etc.).

Story issues and morals were relatable to the reader (particularly the parents that would be reading to their children), such as television addiction, sibling rivalry, trying to fit in with their friends, personal hygiene, refusing to eat their dinner, punctuality, but others are about theft and deforestation, as well as an implied anti hunting message in "An Elephant Never Forgets". Supernatural characters varied from witch doctors (Doctor Moribundus, The Barber of Civil), poltergeists (The Spaghetti Man), to snake-oil salesmen. There were also fairies, talking animals, aliens, inanimate objects coming to life (such as drawings), and witches, as well as cursed objects, and absurd occurrences (such as piglets travelling across the countryside disguised as a man); other villains, like Farmer Tregowan, were regular people with extremely violent methods of punishment. Children could be shapeshifted, eaten alive, kidnapped, or turned into food. Due to many of the parents' child neglect and lack of discipline, many of the outcomes of their children's stories do not appear to affect their lives. Some of the workaholic parents are too busy to notice that their child has either been maimed or has disappeared and others are implied to be such insignificance in their children's lives that they do not appear as characters in the story. Meanwhile, happy (or bittersweet) endings were about the character learning from their bad behaviour and turning their lives around before things got worse.

Book list

Television series

Between 2000 and 2012, two animated adaptations were made for CITV and NickToons. Both were produced and animated by Honeycomb Animation as well as Rix's own television company Elephant (later renamed Little Brother). Producing partner Nigel Planer performed in the cartoons as the narrator of the stories during each episodes' framing devices. The first animated adaptation aired on CITV between January 2000 and October 2006, and the second aired on Nicktoons between May 2011 and November 2012.

Merchandise
Kindle versions of the first four books were briefly available to buy in 2011.

Nigel Planer was the narrator for this series and played Uncle Grizzly. He also narrated Fearsome Tales for Fiendish Kids on audiobook. Bill Wallis narrated More Grizzly Tales for Gruesome Kids, and Grizzly Tales for Gruesome Kids and Ghostly Tales for Ghastly Kids were both read by Andrew Sachs. 
Orion Audiobooks have also released full CD recordings of the books, read by Rupert Degas. Audio Go have re-released the original Grizzly Tales for Gruesome Kids audiobook on CD and download.

Reception
The franchise received a positive reaction from critics, and audiences of many ages. The second cartoon programme frequently appeared on audience-rated "favourite programme" lists on Nickelodeon. A reporter for The Sunday Times noted "I played all five [audiobook adaptations] to my own junior jury aged 12, 7 and 5. They sat spellbound for 75 minutes, a rare event." Books for Your Children predicted that the series would be entertaining for everyone: "An excellent book of stories for all but the most timid ... the accumulation of grimness is also part of the effect, so older children can enjoy this collection by themselves and adults can have a marvellous time reading them to younger ones", whereas The Evening Standard encouraged it: "It may be a children's story, but many a modern-day trendy parent could watch and learn." The School Librarian added: "Jamie Rix tells us that bad ghosts always stay that way but bad children can improve, which is reassuring because his stories are full of unpleasant children."

Honeycomb producer Susan Bor explained: "What really appealed to me about adapting these wonderful stories for TV was that they were new and fresh, there was nothing out there like it and I particularly wanted the design and look of the series to have that originality." When the CITV cartoon debuted, Carol McDaid of The Observer referred to it as "a quirky new animated series". Reviews noted a connection between the franchise and other respected children's media: "This beautifully conceived and executed series follows in the centuries-old Grimm tradition of sadistic fairy-tale fantasy," wrote Victor Lewis-Smith in The Evening Standard, "and there's something reminiscent of Heinrich Hoffman's Shockheaded Peter about the fiendishly cruel (yet satisfyingly appropriate) fates that befall badly behaved children..." The Daily Telegraph compared the series to Roald Dahl, William Browne, and Hilaire Belloc, a possible reference to Belloc's poetry book Cautionary Tales for Children.

Stories from the books were read by Nigel Planer on radio throughout the 1990s. From 1990, the show appeared on BBC Radio 5, and in 1994, it appeared on BBC Radio 4.

Awards and nominations
Both the books and the two television adaptations have received awards and nominations for their work.

Books

Television

List of published short stories

Grizzly Tales for Gruesome Kids (1990)

Ghostly Tales for Ghastly Kids (1992)

Fearsome Tales for Fiendish Kids (1996)

More Grizzly Tales For Gruesome Kids (2001)

Nasty Little Beasts (April 2007)

Gruesome Grown Ups (April 2007)

The "Me!" Monsters (July 2007)

Freaks of Nature (July 2007)

Terror Time Toys (February 2008)

Blubbers and Sicksters (February 2008)

The Gnaughty Gnomes of "NO!" (July 2008)

Superzeroes (July 2008)

A Grizzly Dozen (2009)
This was a compilation book containing stories from the previous books in the Grizzly Tales: Cautionary Tales for Lovers of Squeam! series.
The Grub A Blub Blub
Monty's Python
The Lobster's Scream
Wolf Child
The Fruit Bat
The Clothes Pigs
Jamie's School Dinners
Silence Is Golden
The Old Tailor of Pelting Moor
Her Majesty's Moley
The Soul Stealer
Nobby's Nightmare

See also 
Struwwelpeter — possible inspiration for the franchise debut
Cautionary Tales for Children — poetry book that has been compared to the book
Goosebumps — American speculative book series for children

References

Notes

Citations

External links
 

 
British children's books
Horror anthologies
Series of children's books
Book series introduced in 1990
BBC Radio 4 programmes
Works by Jamie Rix
2000s British children's television series